The Men's Overall in the 2018 FIS Alpine Skiing World Cup involved 36 events in 5 disciplines: downhill (DH) (9 races), Super-G (SG) (6 races), giant slalom (GS) (8 races), slalom (SL) (11 races), and Alpine combined (AC) (2 races). Marcel Hirscher of Austria won the overall title for the seventh consecutive time.  Although Hirscher had broken his ankle in August, prior to the start of the season, he clinched the title a full two weeks before the season finals in Åre, Sweden. In so doing, Hirscher extended his own record of six consecutive overall World Cup titles, which he had set the season before, and set the all-time record with seven overall , as the prior record was six, set by Annemarie Moser-Pröll in 1978-79. 

Hirscher also tied the record for men of 13 wins in a World Cup season, equalling the mark set by Ingemar Stenmark (1978-79) and Hermann Maier (2000-01).

The season was interrupted by the 2018 Winter Olympics from 12-24 February 2018 at Yongpyong Alpine Centre (slalom and giant slalom) at the Alpensia Sports Park in PyeongChang and at the Jeongseon Alpine Centre (speed events) in Jeongseon, South Korea.

Standings

See also
 2018 Alpine Skiing World Cup – Men's summary rankings
 2018 Alpine Skiing World Cup – Men's Downhill
 2018 Alpine Skiing World Cup – Men's Super-G
 2018 Alpine Skiing World Cup – Men's Giant Slalom
 2018 Alpine Skiing World Cup – Men's Slalom
 2018 Alpine Skiing World Cup – Men's Combined
 2018 Alpine Skiing World Cup – Women's Overall
 World Cup scoring system

References

External links
 Alpine Skiing at FIS website

Men's Overall
FIS Alpine Ski World Cup overall titles